Crassispira brocchii is an extinct species of sea snail, a marine gastropod mollusk in the family Pseudomelatomidae, the turrids and allies.

Description
The length of the shell attains 40 mm.

Distribution
Fossils have been found in Pliocene  strata of Andalusia, Spain and Southern France

References

 Cossmann (M.), 1896 Essais de Paléoconchologie comparée (2ème livraison), p. 1-179

External links
 MNHN: Drillia (Crassispira) brocchii

brocchii
Gastropods described in 1841